Adne van Engelen (born 16 March 1993) is a Dutch cyclist, who currently rides for UCI Continental team .

Major results
Source:
2015
 2nd Overall Tour of Egypt
2016
 6th Overall Tour de Hongrie
 7th Overall Tour of Thailand
2017
 3rd Overall Tour du Cameroun
2018
 1st  Road race, World University Cycling Championships
 1st Stage 10 Tour of Poyang Lake
2021
 2nd Overall Tour of Thailand 
1st  Mountains classification
1st Stage 6
2022
 9th Overall Tour of Thailand
 2nd Overall Tour de Serbie
 8th Overall Tour of Azerbaijan
2023
 1st  Overall Tour of Sharjah
1st Stage 4
 3rd Overall New Zealand Cycle Classic

References

External links

1993 births
Living people
Dutch male cyclists
People from Schagen
Cyclists from North Holland
21st-century Dutch people